Mohammad Imran (born on November 15, 1986) is a Pakistani international footballer playing currently for Pakistan Army FC.

He made his international debut during the 2005 Indo-Pak series.

The left back won the Pakistan Premier League with Army in 2005 and 2007. Imran was also declared Most Valuable Player (MVP) of Pakistan Premier League 2007-08.

Honours

With Pakistan Army FC
Pakistan Premier League 2005, 2006/2007

References

Living people
Pakistani footballers
Pakistan international footballers
Association football fullbacks
1986 births
Footballers at the 2006 Asian Games
Asian Games competitors for Pakistan